Robert Nettleton Field (3 March 1899–18 February 1987) was a New Zealand artist, sculptor, potter and art teacher. He was born in Bromley, Kent, England on 3 March 1899. Field was described as “a quiet man who has never sought publicity and makes the most
modest claims for himself.”

Influence
Field was an influential teacher to Colin McCahon who was especially interested in Field's idea of finding one's 'direction' as an artist. McCahon stated, “The painter’s life for me was exemplified by the life and work of R.N. Field.”

References

1899 births
1987 deaths
New Zealand artists
New Zealand educators
New Zealand potters
English emigrants to New Zealand
People from Bromley
20th-century ceramists